Missouri State Capitol Historic District is a national historic district located at Jefferson City, Cole County, Missouri.  It encompasses 122 contributing buildings in the central business district of Jefferson City. The district developed between about 1850 and 1950, and includes representative examples of Classical Revival, Late Victorian, Queen Anne, Mission Revival, and Modern Movement style architecture. Located in the district are the separately listed Missouri State Capitol, Lohman's Landing Building, Cole County Historical Society Building, Cole County Courthouse and Jail-Sheriff's House, Missouri Governor's Mansion, and Tergin Apartment Building.  Other notable buildings include the St. Peter's Roman Catholic Church complex (1881-1883), Margaret Upshulte House (c. 1865), Broadway State Office Building (1938), Supreme Court of Missouri (1905-1906), U.S. Post Office and Courthouse (1932-1934), Lohman's Opera House (c. 1885), Missouri State Optical (c. 1840s), First United Methodist Church (1900), Carnegie Public Library (1901), Temple Beth El (1883), and Joseph and Susie Kolkmeyer House (c. 1907).

It was listed on the National Register of Historic Places in 1976, with a boundary increase in 2002.

References

Historic districts on the National Register of Historic Places in Missouri
Neoclassical architecture in Missouri
Victorian architecture in Missouri
Queen Anne architecture in Missouri
Mission Revival architecture in Missouri
Modernist architecture in Missouri
Buildings and structures in Cole County, Missouri
Buildings and structures in Jefferson City, Missouri
National Register of Historic Places in Cole County, Missouri